Polymastia is a genus of sea sponges containing about 30 species. These are small to large encrusting or dome-shaped sponges with a smooth surface having many teat-shaped projections (papillae). In areas of strong wave action, this genus does not grow the teat structures, but instead grows in a corrugated form.

Species
The following species are recognised:

References

North East Atlantic Taxa

 
Sponge genera
Taxa named by James Scott Bowerbank